Nogalia is a monotypic genus of flowering plants belonging to the family Boraginaceae. The only species is Nogalia drepanophylla.

Its native range is Northeastern Tropical Africa, Southern Arabian Peninsula.

References

Boraginoideae
Boraginaceae genera
Monotypic asterid genera